The Central Flyway is a bird migration route that generally follows the Great Plains in the United States and Canada.  The main endpoints of the flyway include the Canadian Prairies and the region surrounding the Gulf of Mexico; the migration route tends to narrow considerably in the Platte River and Missouri River valleys of central and eastern Nebraska, which accounts for the high number of bird species found there.  Some birds even use this flyway to migrate from the Arctic Ocean to Patagonia.  Routes used by birds are typically established because no mountains or large hills block the flyway over its entire extent. Good sources of water, food, and cover exist over its entire length.

The other primary migration routes for North American birds includes the Atlantic, Mississippi and Pacific Flyways.  The Central Flyway merges with the Mississippi Flyway between Missouri and the Gulf of Mexico.

The Central Flyway Council is composed of representatives from agencies responsible for migratory bird management in 10 states, two Canadian provinces and the Northwest Territories. Member states and provinces in the council are: Montana, Wyoming, Colorado, New Mexico, Texas, Oklahoma, Kansas, Nebraska, South Dakota, North Dakota, Alberta and Saskatchewan.

Notable locations
 Galloway Bay and Miry Bay (the west end of Lake Diefenbaker), Saskatchewan
 Beaverhill Lake, Alberta

External links
 Central Americas Flyway Factsheet from BirdLife International
Central Flyway Council
North American Migration Flyways

Bird migration flyways